"Free Loop (One Night Stand)" (titled as "Free Loop" on Daniel Powter) is a song written by Canadian singer Daniel Powter. It was his second single and the follow-up to his successful song, "Bad Day". In the United Kingdom, WEA failed to realize the single was deemed ineligible to chart since "Bad Day" was included as B-side whilst still being in the UK top 40 at the time. In the US, it did not chart on the Billboard Hot 100, but it did reach the top 30 of the Billboard Adult Contemporary chart. The song was featured in Cheetah Mobile's 2016 iOS/Android app Piano Tiles 2. It was also used in a 2007 advertisement showcasing the Ford I-Max in Taiwan.

Music video
The video, directed by Marc Webb, who also directed the music videos for "Bad Day" and "Lie to Me," shows a young Daniel Powter starting at a piano in a music store and puts his fingers on the window and magically plays the piano. The scene then cuts to an adult version of Powter, who is now able to buy the piano. He then sees a note of eviction on his apartment door and has to sell the piano back to pay for the rent. After selling the piano back, he is shown at a bar where a talent scout talks to him about being part of a once-in-a-lifetime offer. Getting ready for his "big performance," he sees the piano demolished after being used in a strip club with glasses thrown at and prostitutes landing on the keys. He then takes it home and repairs it to its former glory. At the final scene he performs it at the "Millennium Biltmore Hotel," and gets an applause from crowd at the end of the song. All the scenes were filmed in California.

Powter explains that he wanted it to reflect on people, their relationships and himself, not about champagne or car rims: It's about people, relationships and situations in "...piano pop music, over-infatuated on steroids."

Charts

Release history

References

External links
 "Free Loop (Behind the Scenes)" on AOL

Daniel Powter songs
2005 singles
2005 songs
Music videos directed by Marc Webb
Song recordings produced by Mitchell Froom
Songs written by Daniel Powter